Minnesota State Highway 54 (MN 54) was a  highway in west-central Minnesota, which ran from its intersection with State Highway 27 in Roseville Township of Grant County and continued north to its northern terminus at its intersection with U.S. Highway 59 / State Highway 55 (co-signed) in Elbow Lake.

Highway 54 passed through Roseville Township, Lien Township, Sanford Township, and Elbow Lake.

Route description
State Highway 54 served as a north–south route between the city of Elbow Lake and State Highway 27.

Highway 54, together with Highway 27, served as an arterial route between Herman and the county seat at Elbow Lake.

The route was legally defined as Constitutional Route 54 in the Minnesota Statutes.

History

Highway 54

State Highway 54 was authorized in 1920 from Elbow Lake to Herman. In 1934, the east-west portion of this route near Herman became part of State Highway 27.

The route was still gravel in 1949.  It was fully paved by 1953.

Highway 54 was turned back to Grant County on June 1, 2020 due to low traffic volumes and its status as a major collector, which functions more as a county state-aid highway or county road. The road is now known as CSAH 54. In exchange, Minnesota State Highway 78 was extended south to Erdahl via CSAH 10.

Major intersections

References

054
Transportation in Grant County, Minnesota